Marjorie Reynolds (née Goodspeed; August 12, 1917 – February 1, 1997) was an American film/television actress and dancer, who appeared in more than 50 films, including the 1942 musical Holiday Inn, in which she and Bing Crosby introduced the song "White Christmas" in a duet, albeit with her singing dubbed.

Early life
The daughter of a doctor and his wife, Reynolds was born Marjorie Goodspeed in Buhl, Idaho. She acted under the names Marjorie Goodspeed and Marjorie Moore. When she was three years old, her family moved to Los Angeles, California. She began to take dancing lessons at age 4. She attended Los Angeles High School.

Career
Beginning at age 6, Reynolds was a featured child actress in such silent films as Scaramouche (1923). At age 8 she stopped acting to concentrate on education until leaving school at 16 to play a ballerina in Herbert Brenon's Wine, Women and Song (1933). She went on to appear in bit parts in many films, including Gone with the Wind (1939) and as a chorus girl in Paramount Pictures musicals. Her first speaking role was in Murder in Greenwich Village (1937) and she then appeared in a number of westerns for Poverty Row studios opposite most of the cowboy stars of the time with the exception of Gene Autry.

Reynolds played the loyal girlfriend opposite wrongly accused Richard Cromwell in Enemy Agent (1940). That same year, in The Fatal Hour, Reynolds appeared for Monogram Pictures as a reporter on the trail of Boris Karloff's detective James Lee Wong and opposite Grant Withers as a cop.

Perhaps her best-known film was Holiday Inn (1942), which introduced the classic song "White Christmas". She performed the song both as a duet with Bing Crosby and later in a solo performance, although her singing was dubbed by Martha Mears. The movie also showcased her dancing ability.

She also had major roles in Fritz Lang's Ministry of Fear (1944) and in the movie Up in Mabel's Room (1944). Her career progression was hindered by the premature death of her mentor, Mark Sandrich.

Reynolds starred with Abbott and Costello in the supernatural comedy The Time of Their Lives (1946), one of the few films with Abbott and Costello as leads but not together as a team. Instead, Costello spends most of his screen time with Reynolds; they play a pair of American Revolution ghosts who need the help of Abbott and his friends to get to heaven. Leonard Maltin's review of the film describes it as "Most unusual film for A&C and one of their best... Imaginative, funny, and well done." She was cast in a supporting role in Mario Lanza's film debut, That Midnight Kiss (1949).

She later appeared in the NBC version of the television series The Life of Riley (1953–1958) and appeared on three episodes of the television series Leave it to Beaver (1960–1963).

Personal life
Reynolds was married to Jack Reynolds, a casting director. The couple had a daughter, Linda, and divorced in 1952. Her second husband was film editor Jon M. Haffen (who during his acting career had been billed as John Whitney). He died in 1985.

Recognition
Reynolds has a star in the Television section of the Hollywood Walk of Fame, at 1525 Vine Street.

Death
On February 1, 1997, having suffered from congestive heart disease, she collapsed and died in Manhattan Beach, California, while walking her dog. She was 79 years old.

Acting credits

Film

Television

Notes

Citations

References

External links

 
 
 
 

1917 births
1997 deaths
American child actresses
American film actresses
American silent film actresses
People from Greater Los Angeles
People from Twin Falls County, Idaho
Actresses from Idaho
Actresses from California
20th-century American actresses